Bukovets may refer to:

Bulgaria 
 Bukovets, Montana Province, a village in Brusartsi Municipality, Montana Province
 Bukovets, Sofia Province, a village in Svoge municipality, Sofia Province
 Bukovets, Veliko Tarnovo Province, a village in Veliko Tarnovo municipality, Veliko Tarnovo Province
 Bukovets, Vidin Province, a village in Vidin Municipality, Vidin Province
 Bukovets, Vratsa Province, a village in Byala Slatina Municipality, Vidin Province

Ukraine 
 Bukovets, Kalush Raion, Ivano-Frankivsk Oblast, a village in Kalush Raion, Ivano-Frankivsk Oblast
 Bukovets, Mizhhirya Raion, a village in Zakarpattia Oblast
 Bukovets, Verkhovyna Raion, Ivano-Frankivsk Oblast, a commune in Verkhovyna Raion, Ivano-Frankivsk Oblast
 Bukovets, Volovets Raion, a village in Zakarpattia Oblast
 Bukovets pass, a mountain pass in the Carpathians

See also 
 Bukovec (disambiguation)
 Bukowiec (disambiguation)
 Bukovac (disambiguation)
 Bucovăț (disambiguation)